QGN can refer to:

 The airport code for Reus Airport in Spain
 Quintessence de Grains Nobles, a rare style of sweet French wine which is a more intense version of a Sélection de Grains Nobles